David Peter Farrar (born 11 September 1967) is a right wing New Zealand political activist, blogger and pollster. He is an infrequent commentator in the media on Internet issues. Farrar has held many roles within the New Zealand National Party and has worked in Parliament for four National Party leaders.

His blog, Kiwiblog, was the most widely read and commented on New Zealand blog in 2009. Farrar also maintains a presence on social networking sites Facebook and Twitter. In 2007 the National Business Review stated that: "Any realistic 'power list' produced in this country would include either Farrar or his fellow blogger and opinion leader Russell Brown."

Education and personal life
Farrar was educated in Wellington, attending St Mark's Church School and Rongotai College. He is of Jewish descent on his father's side.

He studied at the University of Otago and later at Victoria University of Wellington. Farrar served on the council of Otago University as a student representative, was president of the Commerce Faculty Students' Association and chaired the Student Representative Council. While he was at the University of Otago, he was the Otago correspondent for Campus News an alternative student newspaper published by a group in Auckland but which was distributed nationwide. The newspaper was published between 1984 and 1988, and Farrar's involvement ran from 1985 to 1987.

Career
Farrar manages his own market research company Curia. Farrar is a member of the Market Research Society of New Zealand.

Farrar was vice-president of the Internet Society of New Zealand, InternetNZ and formerly a director of New Zealand Domain Name Registry Ltd (.nz Registry Services), and is a frequent commentator in both broadcast and print media on Internet issues.

Previously Farrar worked as a staff member of the Leader of the Opposition (1999–2004), a staff member at National Party Head Office (1999 and 2004), a staff member in Ministerial Services under Jim Bolger (1996–1997) and in the Prime Minister's Office under Jenny Shipley (1997–1999).

Farrar wrote weekly columns for the National Business Review and the iPredict futures site, and is an occasional commentator on Radio New Zealand and Newstalk ZB.

The New Zealand Listener 2009 Power List named Farrar the fourth most powerful person in the New Zealand media, saying "Kiwiblog has become part of the daily routine for Beltway insiders and others with an interest in politics and public policy."

Political involvement

Taxpayers' Union
In 2013, Farrar, with Jordan Williams, established the fiscally conservative lobby group, the New Zealand Taxpayers' Union. The Union is based on the United Kingdom TaxPayers Alliance and resulted from both Farrar and Williams' interaction with that group's founder, Matthew Elliot, through the International Young Democrat Union.

Young Nationals 
Farrar was previously national secretary of the young wing of the New Zealand National Party, the Young Nationals. During his tenure as national secretary, he survived some media calls for his resignation when he was arrested for his part in a joke press release, along with fellow Young National Michael P Moore, announcing that maverick National MP Michael Laws had been assassinated and that the Prime Minister was one of over 10,000 suspects. The joke press-release was made with the New Zealand Police logo. Farrar and Moore were subsequently arrested, but not convicted of any crime as they chose to participate in a diversion scheme for first time offenders of minor crime. The infamous fax and related media items are now displayed at the Backbencher Bar on Molesworth Street in Wellington, across the road from Parliament.

Farrar is an honorary life member of the Young Nationals, due to his many years of service to the organisation.

Campaign manager
At the 2005 general election Farrar was the volunteer campaign manager for National's  candidate Mark Blumsky. Blumsky was defeated in his attempt to become an electorate MP, but succeeded in entering parliament via the party list.

Political views
Farrar professes a classical liberal approach to politics, and identifies as a moderate of the centre-right on the political spectrum. He was a co-chair of National's Classical Liberal Policy Advisory Group at its formation in 2004. He supported the legalisation of prostitution and of civil unions in New Zealand. Farrar supports a New Zealand republic and is on the National Council of New Zealand Republic campaign. Economically his views are more in keeping with those of parties to the right of the National Party, such as the libertarianism of the minority ACT party.

Farrar has appeared before Parliamentary select committees on a range of issues, including the Electoral Finance Bill. He often publishes his submissions on his blog.

See also

 New Zealand blogosphere

References

External links

 Personal website
 Kiwiblog
 InternetNZ biography

1967 births
Living people
New Zealand bloggers
New Zealand libertarians
New Zealand National Party politicians
New Zealand people of Jewish descent
New Zealand republicans
People educated at Rongotai College
Pollsters
Victoria University of Wellington alumni
University of Otago alumni